The Colt Mustang XSP is a lightweight, single-action pocket pistol chambered for the .380 ACP cartridge, produced by Colt's Manufacturing Company. This firearm model was introduced in 2013 with an updated polymer frame version, of the Mustang Pocketlite.

Brief history
In 2013, Colt introduced the Mustang XSP, a new polymer frame version with updated design. This included front and back strap checking, molded grips, squared off and undercut trigger guard, ambidextrous safety, drift-able sights, single slot accessory rail, polymer guide rod.

Specifications
Chambering: .380 ACP
Weight: 11.80 ounces
Weight with empty magazine: 12.3 ounces 
Trigger Pull: 4 pounds 5 ounces 
Barrel Length: 2.815 inches 
Barrel Diameter: 0.472 inch 
Overall Height: 3.94 inches 
Overall Length: 5.6 inches 
Grip Width: 1.02 inches 
Slide Width: 0.756 inch 
Maximum Width: 1.17 inches 
Trigger Reach: 2.36 inches 
Magazine Capacity: 6+1  
Sights: Black, windage adjustable 
Accessory Rail: Yes

See also

References

External links
G&A review
Shooting Illustrated Review
TTAG review
Facebook group about Mustang Pocketlite, Plus II and XSP

Colt semi-automatic pistols
.380 ACP semi-automatic pistols
Weapons and ammunition introduced in 2013